is a private university in Inazawa, Aichi, Japan. The predecessor of the school was founded in 1941.

Associated institutions
 is a junior college in Nishi-ku, Nagoya, Japan. It has been affiliated with Nagoya Bunri University since 1999, and offers courses in nutrition.

, a vocational school in Nishi-ku, Nagoya, is also affiliated with Nagoya Bunri University.

References

External links

 English portion of Official website
 Official website 

Educational institutions established in 1941
Private universities and colleges in Japan
Universities and colleges in Aichi Prefecture
Inazawa
1941 establishments in Japan